Bembla-Mnara is a municipality in Monastir Governorate, Tunisia. It consists of the town of Bembla and the village Mnara. Bembla is the seat of an  governoral delegation.

References

External links
 

Populated places in Monastir Governorate